The UNLV Lady Rebels basketball team is the women's basketball team that represents the University of Nevada, Las Vegas in Paradise, Nevada. The team currently competes in the Mountain West Conference. Since beginning in 1974, the Lady Rebels have an all-time record of 741–484. The Lady Rebels are currently coached by Lindy La Rocque, who is entering her third season.

Retired numbers
UNLV has retired three jersey numbers in its history. All three held school records for the Lady Rebels, with Thomas being the all-time leader in scoring (since passed) and assists, Frohlich being the all-time scoring leader and rebounder, and Jordan being the all-time leader in blocks.

NCAA tournament results

References

External links